A senatorial election was held on November 12, 1957 in the Philippines. The Nacionalista Party, despite losing two seats to the Liberal Party still held the Senate with twenty seats. The Liberals who won were actor Rogelio de la Rosa and former basketball player Ambrosio Padilla.

Retiring incumbents

Nacionalista Party
Jose P. Laurel
Manuel Briones

Incumbents running elsewhere 
These ran in the middle of their Senate terms. For those losing in their respective elections, they can still return to the Senate to serve out their term, while the winners will vacate their Senate seats, then it would have been contested in a special election concurrently with the next general election.

 Claro M. Recto (NCP), ran for president and lost
 Lorenzo Tañada (NCP), ran for vice president and lost

Results
The Nacionalista Party won six seats contested in the election, while the Liberal Party won two.

Nacionalistas Roseller T. Lim, Cipriano Primcias Sr., and Gil Puyat defended their Senate seats

The two winning Liberals are neophyte senators: Ambrosio Padilla and Rogelio de la Rosa. Also entering the Senate for the first time are Nacionalistas Eulogio Balao, Oscar Ledesma, and Arturo Tolentino.

Incumbent Jose Zulueta left the Nacionalista Party for the People's (Veterans) Democratic Movement for Good Government; he lost the election. Two Nacionalistas also lost: Francisco Afan Delgado and Jose Locsin.

Key:
 ‡ Seats up
 + Gained by a party from another party
 √ Held by the incumbent
 * Held by the same party with a new senator

Per candidate

Per party

See also
Commission on Elections
4th Congress of the Philippines

References

External links
 The Philippine Presidency Project
 Official website of the Commission on Elections

1957
Senate election